Drosera modesta, the modest rainbow, is a scrambling perennial tuberous species in the carnivorous plant genus Drosera. It is endemic to Western Australia and grows on granite outcrops or stream banks in laterite or sand-clay soils. D. modesta produces shield-shaped carnivorous leaves with longer than normal tentacles. White flowers bloom from October to November.

Drosera modesta was first described and named by Ludwig Diels in 1904.

See also
List of Drosera species

References

Carnivorous plants of Australia
Caryophyllales of Australia
Eudicots of Western Australia
Plants described in 1904
modesta